Prunedale is a census-designated place in Monterey County, California, United States. The population was 18,885 as of the 2020 census, up from 17,560 in 2010. Plum trees were grown in Prunedale in the early days of its founding, but the trees died soon after due to poor irrigation and fertilizer.

History 
One of the area's earliest settlers was Charles Langley, a Watsonville banker, who also operated the Prunedale post office, which opened in 1894, closed in 1908, and re-opened in 1953. Langley helped establish the Watsonville post office mail service in Prunedale. Langley Canyon Road in Prunedale is named after the Langley family. It was around the time of Prunedale's founding that the plum orchard failed due to a lack of irrigation and fertilizer, yet the name Prunedale was retained. The unincorporated area maintains a rural feel in most areas.

A major development in the area's history occurred when U.S. Route 101 was rerouted through Prunedale between 1931 and 1932. U.S. Highway 101 had previously run directly from Salinas to San Juan Bautista. That old route is now known as San Juan Grade Road. In 1946, Highway 101 was widened to four lanes. As Prunedale has grown, increased traffic congestion made Route 101 through Prunedale a Traffic Safety Corridor and a double traffic fine zone in the late 1990s and early 2000s, with reduced speed limits to 55 miles per hour. Detailed plans to build a 101 bypass of Prunedale did not develop. After Caltrans purchased the land for the bypass, it was resolved to improve the highway through Prunedale by adding a San Miguel Canyon overpass, improving the Highway 101 and Highway 156 interchange, making more turn and merge lanes, and making several other improvements on the roadway. These improvements were completed in the early 2000s. In the last few years, with a decline in traffic fatalities, the speed limit was increased to 60 miles per hour via state traffic formulas.

One of the original businesses to inhabit Prunedale was Glenn's. In the 1970s, the Prunedale Shopping Center was built. The Prunedale Senior Citizens' Center was built in 1989 with grant funds secured by then Monterey County Supervisor Marc Del Piero. Meals for seniors and public assistance programs, including a bi-weekly food bank giveaway, continue to be operated from that facility. In the 1980s, the Prunetree Shopping Center opened for business.

Geography 
It is bordered to the northeast by San Benito County, to the north by the community of Aromas, and to the west by the community of Elkhorn.

Langley Creek flows by Highway 101 through Prunedale, and is visible at the intersection of Highway 101 and Tustin Road, and again at the intersection of Prunedale South Road and Blackie Road.

Demographics

2010
At the 2010 census Prunedale had a population of 17,560. The racial makeup of Prunedale was 11,771 (67.0%) White, 177 (1.0%) African American, 199 (1.1%) Native American, 672 (3.8%) Asian, 58 (0.3%) Pacific Islander, 3,639 (20.7%) from other races, and 1,044 (5.9%) from two or more races. Hispanic or Latino of any race were 7,322 persons (41.7%).

The census reported that 17,552 people (100% of the population) lived in households, 2 (0%) lived in non-institutionalized group quarters, and 6 (0%) were institutionalized.

There were 5,703 households, 2,130 (37.3%) had children under the age of 18 living in them, 3,607 (63.2%) were opposite-sex married couples living together, 513 (9.0%) had a female householder with no husband present, 323 (5.7%) had a male householder with no wife present. There were 340 (6.0%) unmarried opposite-sex partnerships, and 54 (0.9%) same-sex married couples or partnerships. 923 households (16.2%) were one person and 367 (6.4%) had someone living alone who was 65 or older. The average household size was 3.08. There were 4,443 families (77.9% of households); the average family size was 3.45.

The age distribution was 4,348 people (24.8%) under the age of 18, 1,575 people (9.0%) aged 18 to 24, 3,933 people (22.4%) aged 25 to 44, 5,647 people (32.2%) aged 45 to 64, and 2,057 people (11.7%) who were 65 or older. The median age was 40.1 years. For every 100 females, there were 101.7 males. For every 100 females age 18 and over, there were 100.2 males.

There were 6,047 housing units at an average density of 130.9 per square mile, of the occupied units 4,352 (76.3%) were owner-occupied and 1,351 (23.7%) were rented. The homeowner vacancy rate was 1.9%; the rental vacancy rate was 3.8%. 13,101 people (74.6% of the population) lived in owner-occupied housing units and 4,451 people (25.3%) lived in rental housing units.

2000
At the 2000 census there were 16,432 people, 5,440 households, and 4,292 families in the CDP. The racial makeup of the CDP was 76.97% White, 1.27% African American, 1.03% Native American, 3.60% Asian, 0.17% Pacific Islander, 11.65% from other races, and 5.30% from two or more races. Hispanic or Latino of any race were 23.01%.

Of the 5,440 households 34.5% had children under the age of 18 living with them, 66.1% were married couples living together, 8.3% had a female householder with no husband present, and 21.1% were non-families. 15.5% of households were one person and 5.3% were one person aged 65 or older. The average household size was 3.01 and the average family size was 3.33.

The age distribution was 26.2% under the age of 18, 7.7% from 18 to 24, 27.4% from 25 to 44, 28.7% from 45 to 64, and 10.0% 65 or older. The median age was 39 years. For every 100 females, there were 102.1 males. For every 100 females age 18 and over, there were 101.4 males.

The median household income was $62,963 and the median family income was $69,341. Males had a median income of $48,863 versus $34,542 for females. The per capita income for the CDP was $24,318. About 6.0% of families and 7.9% of the population were below the poverty line, including 8.6% of those under age 18 and 6.0% of those age 65 or over. Most of Prunedale's residents live in single family detached homes with individual or shared wells and leach fields.

Transportation 
Prunedale is served by Monterey–Salinas Transit, with connections to Amtrak at San Jose Diridon station. Caltrans has a park and ride at the intersection of US Route 101 and California State Route 156.

Environmental 
In the hills above Prunedale is one of the few known colonies of Yadon's piperia, an endangered species of wild orchid. Royal Oaks Park and Manzanita Park, owned by Monterey County, offer nearby recreation. Much of Prunedale's land is oak reserve to protect the California's native trees.

Gallery

References 

Census-designated places in Monterey County, California
Census-designated places in California